Slowey is an Irish surname.  Notable people with the surname include:

Jane Slowey, British charity worker
Jason Slowey (born 1989), American football player in the National Football League
Kevin Slowey (born 1984), American baseball pitcher
Patrick Slowey, builder of the historic Patrick Slowey House in Massachusetts

English-language surnames